Michael Hawkins may refer to:

Michael Hawkins (basketball) (born 1972), American former professional basketball player
Michael Hawkins (American actor) (born 1938), American actor
Michael Hawkins (British actor) (1928–2014), British actor
Michael Hawkins (bishop), Bishop of Saskatchewan
Michael Daly Hawkins (born 1954), US Court of Appeals judge
Michael Hawkins (footballer) (born 1951), Australian rules footballer
Mike Hawkins (cornerback) (born 1983), American football cornerback
Mike Hawkins (linebacker) (born 1955), former American football linebacker
Mike Hawkins (musician) (born 1991), Danish DJ and record producer